Air Commodore Władysław Józef Marian Turowicz (23 April 1908 – 8 January 1980), usually referred to as W. J. M. Turowicz, was a Polish-Pakistani aviator, military scientist and aeronautical engineer.

Turowicz was the administrator of Pakistan's Space and Upper Atmosphere Research Commission (SUPARCO) from 1967 to 1970. He was one of forty five Polish officers and airmen who joined RPAF on contract in the early fifties. After completion of his initial contract, Turowicz opted to stay on in Pakistan and continued to serve in PAF and later, SUPARCO.

Turowicz made significant contributions to Pakistan's missile/rocket program as a chief aeronautical engineer. In Pakistan, he remains highly respected as a scientist and noted aeronautical engineer.

Early life and education
Turowicz was born to an aristocratic family in the village of Wadziejewsko in Siberia (Russia) in 1908, where he graduated from high school. The Polish name of the village may suggest it was inhabited by Poles who were exiled or imprisoned by the Tsar, as it was unusual for Polish aristocrats to live in Siberia for non-political reasons. From an early age on, Turowicz was fascinated by aviation technology and had collected different models of aircraft. Due to this passion, he moved to Warsaw where he attended the most prestigious engineering institute, the Warsaw University of Technology (WTU) in 1930, majoring in aeronautical engineering; upon graduation, he received his PhD with honours in 1936. While at Warsaw University of Technology, Turowicz joined and became a pioneering member of a Aeroklub Polski  (better known as Polish Aero Club) where he had previliged to study and work with noted Polish engineers to the field of aerospace engineering. A distinguished member of Polski Club, he had an opportunity to study and work with Ryszard Bartel, Jerzy Drzewiecki, Henry Millicer, to name a few. It was here at the Aero Club that Turowicz met his future wife, Zofia Turowicz with whom he would have 4 children. In addition, he completed an MSc in astrodynamics in 1937 from the same institution. He joined the Polish Air Force as an aeronautical engineer and fighter pilot, but later emigrated to United Kingdom where he joined the Royal Air Force in 1939 as a reservist Polish pilot.

World War II and RAF career

Though initially joining the Polish Air Force, Turowicz enlisted as a Royal Air Force reservist during World War II. He was immediately sent to Great Britain where he flew the British-built Handley Page Halifax during the war. Later, he was transferred into the Royal Air Force Aeronautics division where he served as Technical Inspector, and was put in charge of aircraft electrical and system information, organising, testing, and evaluating aircraft. After World War II, Turowicz did not return to Communist Poland due to the official negative attitude towards those who had served with the Western Allies during the war.

Career with the Pakistan Air Force

As the political situation in Poland got worse, many Polish Air Force officers began to move to the United States, Australia, Norway and Canada. Turowicz and 45 of his colleagues opted to move to Pakistan in 1948 on a three-year contract.

Turowicz set up technical institutes in Karachi. He taught and revitalised Pakistan Air Force Academy, where he worked as a chief scientist. He initially led the technical training in the airbase and a part of the Polish specialists in the technical section in Karachi.

In 1952, Turowicz was promoted to the rank of wing commander.  In 1959, Turowicz was promoted in the rank of group captain. In 1960, he became an air commodore and an assistant chief of air staff, in charge of PAF's Maintenance Branch.

Pakistan's space program
In 1966, the Government of Pakistan transferred him to SUPARCO, Pakistan's national space agency.

SUPARCO Administrator

Family

Zofia, Turowicz's wife, and his two daughters joined him in Karachi in 1949, where a third daughter was born. Between 1950 and 1954, Zofia taught gliding to the Shaheen Air Cadets in Karachi and Rawalpindi.  Two of his daughters married Pakistanis while the third daughter married a Bangladeshi.  His widow, Zofia Turowicz, who died in 2012, was awarded the Pride of Performance and Sitara-i-Imtiaz, and taught applied mathematics and particle physics at the Karachi University. Turowicz's son is currently working at the SUPARCO as an aerospace engineer and chief scientist. Turowicz's grandson has completed a PhD in quantum physics from Brown University and is currently running the AI statistical modelling division at JP Morgan.

Documentary

A documentary film on the life and scientific work of Air Cdre Władysław Turowicz was completed in 2008. It was directed by Anna T. Pietraszek, a Polish journalist and film-maker with an honorary Pakistani citizenship. The film shows how Air Cdre Turowicz and other Polish officers and technicians had contributed in building the PAF soon after independence.

Death and legacy

Air. Cdre. Turowicz was involved in a car accident on 8 January 1980 along with his driver. He was quickly taken to the military hospital where he was pronounced dead. He was buried in the Christian Cemetery in Karachi with full military honours. Both Polish, including the Consul-General of Poland in Karachi Mr. Kazimierz Maurer, and Pakistani military and civilian personnel attended his funeral in Karachi. The Government of Pakistan issued a condolence letter to his family, stating that Turowicz was not only an outstanding Air Force officer.

Honours and recognition
In 2005, the PAF Museum, Karachi, placed a memorial plaque in the honour of Air. Cdre. Władysław Turowicz where both Polish and Pakistani civilian and military personnel attended. On this occasion the Consul General of the Republic of Poland in Karachi Ireneusz Makles profoundly thanked the PAF and especially Air Chief Marshal Rao Qamar Suleman and other officers for their efforts to make this memorial a reality.
 Władysław Turowicz Monument (PAF Museum, Karachi).
  Władysław Turowicz Space Complex (SUPARCO), Lahore Center.

Awards and decorations
 Sitara-e-Pakistan (1965)
 Tamgha-i-Pakistan (1967)
 Sitara-i-Khidmat (1967)
 Sitara-e-Quaid-e-Azam (1971)
 Sitara-e-Imtiaz, (Mil) (1972)
 Abdus Salam Award in Aeronautical Engineering (1978)
 ICTP Award in Space Physics (1979)

Foreign decorations

See also

 Space and Upper Atmosphere Research Commission
 Sonmiani Satellite Launch Center
 Polish Air Force
 Pakistan Air Force
 Abdul Majid (physicist)
 Abdus Salam
 Polish people in Pakistan

References

External links
 
 Consulate General of Poland in Karachi IM

Polish aviators
Polish Army officers
Polish World War II pilots
Polish aerospace engineers
Pakistan Air Force air marshals
Project-706
People from the Russian Empire of Polish descent
Pakistani aviators
20th-century Pakistani engineers
Warsaw University of Technology alumni
Rocket scientists
Polish scientists
20th-century Polish engineers
People from Zabrze
Polish military engineers
Pakistani military engineers
Pakistani aerospace engineers
People with acquired Pakistani citizenship
Space and Upper Atmosphere Research Commission people
1980 deaths
Polish emigrants to Pakistan
1908 births
Military personnel from Karachi
Engineers from Karachi
Road incident deaths in Pakistan
Administrators of the Space and Upper Atmosphere Research Commission
Recipients of the Sitara-e-Pakistan
Naturalised citizens of Pakistan
Pakistani Protestants
Polish Protestants